Backbencher is a monthly youth magazine published in India. The magazine is published by Nagpur-based publisher Crazy Minds. Every month the magazine carries a biopic cover story of a successful person who did poorly in their studies during school or college. The goal of publishing these stories is to motivate students who do not do well in school.

References

External links
 Official website

2014 establishments in Maharashtra
Education magazines
English-language magazines published in India
Monthly magazines published in India
Magazines established in 2014
Youth magazines
Mass media in Nagpur